Guanzón is a Hispanized Hokkien surname. Notable people with the surname include:

Bobby Guanzon (1948–2016), Filipino radio and television broadcaster and politician
Rowena Guanzon (born 1957), Filipino lawyer and politician

Hokkien-language surnames